Nevitt is a given name and surname. Notable people with the name include:

Nevitt Sanford (1909–1995), American psychology professor
Chuck Nevitt (born 1959), American basketball player
Garland Nevitt (1887–1970), American football, basketball and baseball coach
Elliott Nevitt (born 1996), English footballer
Thomas Nevitt (1864–1932), Australian politician

See also
Nevit, given name
Nevett, surname